In mathematics, a bicategory (or a weak 2-category) is a concept in category theory used to extend the notion of category to handle the cases where the composition of morphisms is not (strictly) associative, but only associative up to an isomorphism. The notion was introduced in 1967 by Jean Bénabou.

Bicategories may be considered as a weakening of the definition of 2-categories. A similar process for 3-categories leads to tricategories, and more generally to weak n-categories for n-categories.

Definition 
Formally, a bicategory B consists of:
 objects a, b, ... called 0-cells;
 morphisms f, g, ... with fixed source and target objects called 1-cells;
 "morphisms between morphisms" ρ, σ, ... with fixed source and target morphisms (which should have themselves the same source and the same target), called 2-cells;
with some more structure:
 given two objects a and b there is a category B(a, b) whose objects are the 1-cells and morphisms are the 2-cells. The composition in this category is called vertical composition;
 given three objects a, b and c, there is a bifunctor  called horizontal composition.
Some more coherence axioms, similar to those needed for monoidal categories, are moreover required to hold: a monoidal category is the same as a bicategory with one 0-cell.

Example: Boolean monoidal category 
Consider a simple monoidal category, such as the monoidal preorder Bool based on the monoid M = ({T, F}, ∧, T). As a category this is presented with two objects {T, F} and single morphism g: F → T.

We can reinterpret this monoid as a bicategory with a single object x (one 0-cell); this construction is analogous to construction of a small category from a monoid. The objects {T, F} become morphisms, and the morphism g becomes a natural transformation (forming a functor category for the single hom-category B(x, x)).

References 

 J. Bénabou. "Introduction to bicategories, part I". In Reports of the Midwest Category Seminar, Lecture Notes in Mathematics 47, pages 1–77. Springer, 1967.

External links 
 

Higher category theory